Krishnasamy Krishnamoorthy (1 July 1944 – 16 January 2019) was an Indian politician. He served as a Member of Lok Sabha from Mayiladuthurai from 1998 to 1999.

Biography 

Krishnasamy Krishnamoorthi was born on 1 July 1944 to Krishnasamy at Kumbakonam in India. He graduated in arts from Government College, Kumbakonam and qualified as a lawyer from Madras Law College.

Politics 

Krishnasamy Krishnamoorthi served as a Member of the Tamil Nadu Legislative Assembly from 1984 to 1988. In 1998, he stood for election from Mayiladuthurai constituency for 12th Lok Sabha as a candidate of Tamil Maanila Congress and won over Pattali Makkal Katchi candidate by margin of 42,456 votes in which the election Mani Shankar Aiyar finished fourth and lost his deposit.

References 

1944 births
2019 deaths
Lok Sabha members from Tamil Nadu
Tamil Maanila Congress politicians
India MPs 1998–1999
People from Mayiladuthurai district
People from Thanjavur district
Tamil Nadu MLAs 1985–1989